Nahathai Thewphaingarm is a Thai businesswoman, educator, and politician. She was a Member of the Parliament of Thailand (2005–2006) and a Vice Spokesman of the Thai government (2001–2002).

Career
She is on the board of an English program at the Thewphaingarm School called TSEP, a family run school in Bangkok. She earned her PhD in education from University of Wisconsin. She was a politician and member of the Parliament. She belonged to the Thai Rak Thai Party. She left the party just before the Thai Rak Thai Party was banned. Today she is the Chief of Counsellor of Thewphaingarm school and Thewphaingarm school English Program Bangkok, Thailand.

On 31 October 2009, she married Thai-Canadian entrepreneur Tan Soamboonsrup.

References

External links
 Facebook
 Linkedin

Nahathai Thewphaingarm
Nahathai Thewphaingarm
University of Wisconsin–Madison School of Education alumni
Nahathai Thewphaingarm
Nahathai Thewphaingarm
Nahathai Thewphaingarm
Nahathai Thewphaingarm
Living people
1970 births
Nahathai Thewphaingarm
Nahathai Thewphaingarm
Nahathai Thewphaingarm